Mispila plagiata is a species of beetle in the family Cerambycidae. It was described by Maurice Pic in 1934.

References

plagiata
Beetles described in 1934